Brassica species are used as food plants by the larvae of a number of Lepidoptera species including:

 Arctiidae
 Giant leopard moth (Hypercompe scribonia)
 Hypercompe abdominalis
 Hypercompe indecisa
 Crambidae
 Cabbage webworm (Hellula rogatalis)
 Cross-striped cabbageworm (Evergestis rimosalis)
 Purplebacked cabbageworm (Evergestis pallidata)
 Geometridae
 Foxglove pug (Eupithecia pulchellata) - recorded on Brassica in Malta
 Garden carpet (Xanthorhoe fluctuata)
 Hepialidae
 Common swift (Korscheltellus lupulina)
 Ghost moth (Hepialus humuli)
 Noctuidae
 Alfalfa looper (Autographa californica) - western US
 Angle shades (Phlogophora meticulosa)
 Beet armyworm (Spodoptera exigua)
 Cabbage looper (Trichoplusia ni)
 Cabbage moth (Mamestra brassicae)
 Garden dart (Euxoa nigricans)
 The Gothic (Naenia typica)
 Heart and club (Agrotis clavis)
 Heart and dart (Agrotis exclamationis)
 Large yellow underwing (Noctua pronuba)
 The nutmeg (Discestra trifolii)
 Setaceous Hebrew character (Xestia c-nigrum)
 Turnip moth (Agrotis segetum)
 Zebra caterpillar (Ceramica picta)
 Pieridae
 Pieris rapae – small white
 Pieris brassicae – large white
 Pontia protodice – southern cabbageworm or checkered white
 Plutellidae
 Diamondback moth (Plutella xylostella)

References
Pests and diseases of Brassica (on Wikibooks)

Brassica
+Lepidoptera